Hartmannsdorf bei Kirchberg is a municipality in the district Zwickau, in Saxony, Germany.

References 

Zwickau (district)